Autoroute 50 may refer to:
 A50 autoroute, in France
 Quebec Autoroute 50, in Quebec, Canada

See also 
 A50 roads
 List of highways numbered 50